Cao Bingkun is a Chinese actor. He graduated from the acting department of Beijing Film Academy in 2005.

Early life and education 
Before deciding to become an actor, Cao wanted to become a chef. He went to a vocational high school to study cooking, and he interned at a roast duck restaurant.

Later on he began working as an extra, and then started studying at Beijing Film Academy in 2001.

Filmography

Film

Television

References

External links 

Cao Bingkun at Douban

People from Beijing
Beijing Film Academy alumni
Chinese film actors
Chinese television actors
Living people
1983 births